Bento Box Entertainment (also known as Bento Box Animation) is an American animation studio located in the North Hollywood neighborhood of Los Angeles, California. It was founded in 2009 by executive producers Scott Greenberg, Joel Kuwahara, and Mark McJimsey. It is a subsidiary of Fox Corporation and operates under the Fox Entertainment division. The studio is best known for producing  Bob's Burgers for Fox prior to its acquisition in August 2019.

Bento Box Entertainment has four animation studios — in North Hollywood, Burbank, Bento Box Animation Studio Atlanta in Atlanta, Georgia, and Bento Box Canada in Toronto, Ontario. The company also operates Princess Bento Studio, a joint venture with Princess Pictures, in Melbourne, Victoria.

History
On October 11, 2016, Bento Box launched a children's division called Sutikki. Sutikki opened an office in the United Kingdom on March 23, 2017.

On August 6, 2019, it was announced that Fox Corporation would acquire Bento Box, while still allowing it to operate as an independent production house; Sutikki was not part of the acquisition.

On April 8, 2020, it formed a pact with Australian film company Princess Pictures called Princess Bento Studio. Their first series Smiling Friends started airing on Adult Swim on January 10, 2022.

On October 5, 2022, Bento Box became a member of the Animation guild.

On December 2, 2022, Bento Box signed a multi-year animation service deal with Princess Pictures's newly acquired studio Boulder Media.

Productions

Television series

Bento Box Entertainment

Sutikki

Princess Bento Studio

Short form series

Direct-to-video animated films

Specials

Theatrical films

Streaming films

Bento Box Interactive 

Bento Box Interactive is an entertainment-based technology company launched in 2012 by Bento Box Entertainment. In October 2012, Bento Box Interactive partnered with Alicia Keys to create an education mobile application entitled "The Journals of Mama Mae and LeeLee" for iOS devices.
The application tells the story of the relationship between a young New York City girl and her wise grandmother and features two original songs by Keys, "Follow the Moon" and "Unlock Yourself".

See also
Walt Disney Television
20th Television Animation
Animation on Fox
Fox Corporation
Animation Domination
Fox Entertainment

References

External links
Official website

American animation studios
Adult animation studios
American companies established in 2009
Mass media companies established in 2009
2009 establishments in California
Companies based in Los Angeles
North Hollywood, Los Angeles
2019 mergers and acquisitions
Fox Corporation subsidiaries